SSPT may refer to:
 Srinivasa Subbaraya Polytechnic College, government polytechnic institution in India
 Swiss Society of Pharmacology and Toxicology, see Life Sciences Switzerland